The Gateway Program (originally Gateway Project) is the planned phased expansion and renovation of the Northeast Corridor (NEC) rail line between Newark, New Jersey, and New York City, New York. The right-of-way runs between Newark Penn Station and New York Penn Station (NYP). The project would build new rail bridges in the New Jersey Meadowlands and new tunnels under Bergen Hill (Hudson Palisades) and the Hudson River, rehabilitate the existing 1910 tunnel, and construct a new terminal annex.

The existing two-track rail line used by both Amtrak and NJ Transit Rail Operations (NJT) has reached its full capacity of 24 trains per hour. The improvements would double train capacity across the Hudson River to 48 trains per hour, allowing for additional high-speed rail service. Gateway was unveiled in 2011, one year after New Jersey Governor Chris Christie's cancellation of the somewhat similar Access to the Region's Core (ARC) project; Some previously planned improvements already underway were incorporated into the Gateway program. New construction of a "tunnel box" that would preserve the right-of-way on Manhattan's West Side began in September 2013, using $185 million in recovery and resilience funding from Hurricane Sandy in 2012.

The need for the Gateway Program increased after Hurricane Sandy damaged the existing North River tunnels. A draft environmental impact statement for the Gateway Program was released in July 2017. Funding for the project had been unclear for several years due to a lack of funding commitments from state and federal government. The project was formally approved by the federal government in May 2021 and final regulatory approval was given that December, with work to commence in 2023.

Announcement and initial phases

The Gateway Project was unveiled on February 7, 2011, by Amtrak President Joseph H. Boardman and New Jersey Senators Frank Lautenberg and Robert Menendez. The announcement also included endorsements from New York Senator Charles Schumer and Amtrak's Board of Directors. Officials said Amtrak would take the lead in seeking financing; a list of potential sources included the states of New York and New Jersey, the City of New York, the Port Authority of New York and New Jersey (PANYNJ), and the Metropolitan Transportation Authority (MTA) as well as private investors.

By late 2011, two parts of the project were underway: the replacement of the Portal Bridge over the Hackensack River and the development of Moynihan Train Hall in Manhattan. Environmental impact statements had been completed and the design and engineering of the new bridges had begun. The ceremonial groundbreaking of the first phase of the conversion of the James Farley Post Office to the new Moynihan Train Hall took place in October 2010. Some funding for the projects comes from the American Recovery and Reinvestment Act of 2009.

Background

Right-of-way

The right-of-way was originally developed by the Pennsylvania Railroad (PRR) in conjunction with the 1910 opening of New York's Pennsylvania Station, which required the construction of the Portal Bridge over the Hackensack River and the North River Tunnels under the Hudson Palisades and Hudson River. The following year the Manhattan Transfer station was opened in the Kearny Meadows to allow changes between steam and electric locomotives. This station also provided for passenger transfers to/from its former main terminal at Exchange Place in Jersey City or the Hudson and Manhattan Railroad (H&M), the forerunner of today's Port Authority Trans Hudson (PATH). The Dock Bridge over the Passaic River was opened in conjunction with adjacent new Newark Penn Station in 1935. In 1937, the H&M was extended over a second span, making the transfer in the meadows redundant.

In 1949, the PRR discontinued its ferry system on the Hudson, and in 1961, it closed its Exchange Place station. In 1963, due to declining traffic and revenue, the PRR demolished the above-ground NYP station. It retained its below-ground passenger concourses and waiting areas, and sold its air rights, enabling construction of a new Madison Square Garden. In 1967, the Aldene Plan was implemented, requiring the floundering Central Railroad of New Jersey (CNJ), Reading (RDG), and Lehigh Valley (LV) railroads, to travel into Newark Penn with continuing service to New York Penn. Under continued financial pressure, the PRR merged with New York Central (NYC) in 1968, but the newly-formed Penn Central (PC) declared bankruptcy on June 21, 1970. In 1976, the PC long-distance service (including part of today's Northeast Corridor and Empire Corridor) was taken over by Amtrak, which had been founded in 1971. Conrail was created in 1976 to bail out numerous Northeast railroads, including the commuter service on the CNJ and the LV. In 1983, when the corporation divested its passenger rail operations, they were taken over by New Jersey Transit (NJT), which had been created in 1979 to operate much of the state's bus system.

In 1991, New Jersey Transit opened the Waterfront Connection, extending service on some non-electrified trains which had previously terminated at Newark Penn Station to Hoboken. In 1996, it began its Midtown Direct service, rerouting some trains from the west which previously terminated at Hoboken Terminal to New York Penn. Secaucus Junction was opened in 2003, allowing passengers travelling from the north to transfer to Northeast Corridor Line, North Jersey Coast Line, or Midtown Direct trains, though not to Amtrak, which does not stop there. Between 1976 and 2010, the number of New Jersey Transit weekday trains crossing the Hudson using the North River Tunnels (under contract with Amtrak) increased from 147 to 438.

Trans-Hudson crossings
The Northeast Corridor is the most heavily traveled railway in the United States, and is the only rail line that travels under the Hudson River and through New York City.  The other rail system crossing the Hudson was developed by the Hudson and Manhattan Railroad, partially in conjunction with the PRR, and taken over by PANYNJ in 1962, who rebranded the H&M as the PATH, a rapid transit system. Direct trans-Hudson rail service to Lower Manhattan from Newark Penn is provided by PATH with additional terminals at World Trade Center and Herald Square in Manhattan, and at Hoboken Terminal and Journal Square in Hudson County, New Jersey. In 1971 New Jersey Governor William T. Cahill proposed constructing another rail tunnel from Weehawken, New Jersey to 48th Street in Midtown Manhattan.

There are three vehicular crossings of the lower Hudson River. The Holland Tunnel, opened in 1927, is minimally used for public transportation and connects Jersey City, New Jersey, to lower Manhattan. The George Washington Bridge, opened in 1931, is used by suburban buses to GWB Bus Terminal, and connects Fort Lee, New Jersey, to upper Manhattan. Its lower level, opened in 1962, is the last new river crossing. The Lincoln Tunnel, composed of three tubes opened in 1937, 1945, and 1954, connects Weehawken, New Jersey, to Midtown Manhattan. More than 6,000 bus trips are made through the tunnel and bus terminal daily.    Its eastern terminus is connected via ramps to the Port Authority Bus Terminal, the gateway for most NJT bus traffic entering Manhattan. Despite the Lincoln Tunnel XBL (express bus lane) during the morning peak there are often long delays due to traffic congestion and the limited capacity of the bus terminal.

Access to the Region's Core

Launched in 1995 by PANYNJ, NJT, and MTA, Access to the Region's Core (ARC) was a Major Investment Study that looked at public transportation ideas for the New York metropolitan area. It found that long-term goals would best be met by better connections to and in-between the region's major rail stations in Midtown Manhattan, Penn Station and Grand Central Terminal. The East Side Access project, including tunnels under the East River and the East Side of Manhattan, which would divert some LIRR traffic to Grand Central, is expected to be completed in December 2022.

The Trans-Hudson Express Tunnel or THE Tunnel, which later took on the name of the study itself, was meant to address the western, or Hudson River, crossing. Engineering studies determined that structural interferences made a new terminal connected to Grand Central or the current Penn Station unfeasible and its final design involved boring under the current rail yard to a new deep cavern terminal station under 34th Street. While Amtrak had acknowledged that the region represented a bottleneck in the national system and had originally planned to complete work by 2040, its timetable for beginning the project was advanced in part due to the cancellation of ARC, a project similar in scope, but with differences in design. That project, which did not include direct Amtrak participation, was cancelled in October 2010 by New Jersey governor Chris Christie, who cited potential cost overruns. Amtrak briefly engaged the governor in attempt to revive the ARC Tunnel and use preliminary work done for it, but those negotiations soon broke down. Amtrak said it was not interested in purchasing any of the work. Senator Menendez later said some preparatory work done for ARC may be used for the new project. Costs for the project were $117 million for preliminary engineering, $126 million for final design, $15 million for construction and $178 million real estate property rights ($28 million in New Jersey and $150 million in New York City). Additionally, a $161 million partially refundable pre-payment of insurance premiums was also made.

Funding and start of construction

Projected costs 
In 2011, the project was projected to cost $13.5 billion and finish in 2020. In April 2011, Amtrak asked that $1.3 billion in United States Department of Transportation (USDOT) funding for NEC rail corridor improvements be allocated to Gateway and related projects. In November 2011, Congress allocated $15 million for engineering work.

In 2012, revised projections put the cost at $14.5 billion and completion date at 2025. In April 2012, the U.S. Senate appropriations subcommittee on transportation proposed to provide another $20 million; that awaits further congressional approval.

While New Jersey officials have said the state will pay its "fair share" of the project, they have committed to no specific dollar amount. In 2013, it was estimated New Jersey's contribution would be between $3 and 5 billion. The source of further funding remains unclear. The state had planned to spend some $600 million on Access to the Region's Core; some of the completed design and engineering work has been used by Amtrak to develop the Gateway Project.

In September 2012, Schumer estimated that the project would need $20 million in 2013 and $100 million in 2014 to keep it from dying.

In December 2012, Amtrak requested $276 million from Congress to upgrade infrastructure damaged by Hurricane Sandy that would also eventually support trains run along the new Gateway Project right-of-way. That earmark funding, which had been revised to $188 million, was deleted from the legislation. However, the United States Department of Transportation provided $185 million from its portion of these Sandy relief and resiliency funds to build the "tunnel box" under the Hudson Yards redevelopment project and rebuild an overlapping Maintenance of Equipment building for the Long Island Rail Road.

In July 2017, the projected cost for the new tunnels under the Hudson River and for the repair of the North River Tunnels increased to $12.9 billion, up from a previous estimate of $7 to 10 billion.

In August 2021, projected costs for construction of the new tunnels and repair of the existing North River Tunnels was revised to $12.3 billion in a financial plan submitted on behalf of the Gateway Development Commission. The States of New York and New Jersey identified their sources of funding for the project, and Amtrak increased its contribution to the project. Early in 2022, the FTA upgraded the rating for the sought Federal Grant share of the tunnel to project, making it eligible for funding. In July 2022, the governors of New York and New Jersey signed a memorandum in which the two states' governments agreed to share the cost of the project. By that August, the projected cost of the tunnels and related projects had increased to $16.1 billion.

Development corporation and commission
In November 2015, Amtrak, U.S. Senators Cory Booker and Chuck Schumer, and Governors Christie and Cuomo announced that a new Gateway Development Corporation would be created to oversee the project with the federal government paying for 50% of its costs and the states sharing the rest.  The Gateway Development Corporation will be formed under the Port Authority of New York and New Jersey. The corporation board will be composed of PANYNJ board members from both states, the USDOT, and Amtrak. Staff will be provided by the PANYNJ and Amtrak. The corporation will oversee planning, environmental, design, engineering and construction work. It would also seek federal grants and apply for loans. It remains unclear how the money will be raised.

In December 2015 new federal legislation was introduced allowing Amtrak to operate the NEC as a financially separate entity, thus able to re-invest profits from the line into new infrastructure. The legislation also provided for more low interest loans through changes in the Railroad Rehabilitation and Improvement Financing and Capital Investment Grant (New Starts) federal funding programs. In March 2016, Amtrak and PANYNJ committed $35 million each for design and engineering work. Additional funding has not been identified.

The group met for the first time on January 12, 2017. On June 30, 2017, the U.S. Department of Transportation sent a letter to the Gateway Development Corporation permanently withdrawing from its board of trustees. Shortly afterward, the draft Environmental Impact Study for the project was issued.

The creation of a new bi-state agency to potentially oversee the project required identical legislation in both New York and New Jersey legislatures. On June 24, 2019, the state governments of New York and New Jersey passed legislation to create the bi-state Gateway Development Commission, whose job it is to oversee the planning, funding and construction of the rail tunnels and bridges of Gateway Program. This bill stipulates that each state is responsible for 50% of the funding and creates standards for transparency and accountability. The Commission is capable of receiving funds from federal, state, and local sources. The Commission's first CEO, Kris Kolluri, was nominated by New York governor Kathy Hochul and New Jersey governor Phil Murphy in early 2022.

Federal funding
The administration of U.S. President Barack Obama called Gateway the most vital piece of infrastructure that needs to be built in the United States. In a September 2015 joint letter to Obama, New Jersey Governor Chris Christie and New York Governor Andrew Cuomo offered to pay half of the project's cost if the federal government picks up the rest, but did not identify how they would fund it. Port Authority of New York and New Jersey Chairman John J. Degnan said in May 2015 that the agency "would step up to the plate" with regard to funding the project. The governors have asked the agency to oversee the project. The administration of President Donald Trump cast doubts about funding for the project, and Trump suggested defunding the FTA's New Starts program for all new projects. In 2017 then-United States Secretary of Transportation Elaine Chao called the project "an absolute priority".

In September 2017, $900 million was allocated for the project in a House of Representatives spending bill. Following the passage of this allocation, 155 Republican and four Democratic representatives co-sponsored a proposed amendment that would take away that funding. One co-sponsor of the amendment, North Carolina Republican Ted Budd, said that "North Carolina and the other 48 states should not have to foot the bill for this hall of fame earmark." Bipartisan groups of representatives from New Jersey disagreed. Rodney Frelinghuysen, a Republican, said: "The people of Texas, victims of an historic storm (Hurricane Harvey), need additional federal disaster assistance.  The people of New Jersey need a safe and well-functioning transportation infrastructure. I intend to continue to fight for both." Bonnie Watson Coleman, a Democrat, stated: "I support restoring the funding that the Trump administration has sought to cut from the New Starts program, but I certainly oppose it coming at the expense of the Gateway project."

On December 14, 2017, Governor Chris Christie committed $1.9 billion, New Jersey's share of the tunnel cost. However, on December 29, 2017, multiple news sources published a letter from a top Federal Transit Administration official who stated that the Gateway Program was a "local" project, thereby putting federal funding for the project in doubt.

In March 2018, Trump talked with U.S. House Speaker Paul Ryan, a Republican from Wisconsin, in an effort to get other Congressional Republicans to oppose federal funding for the Gateway Program in the omnibus spending bill that was then being worked on. However, when the Consolidated Appropriations Act was signed on March 23, 2018, it provided $2.9 billion to discretionary grant programs, which Amtrak and its partners could potentially use to begin financing the project. Democrats said that the bill would provide as much as $541 million in the 2018 fiscal year as well as making Gateway eligible to compete for additional funding with other transportation projects. The bill allocated $650 million to Amtrak for improvements to the Northeast Corridor, of which Amtrak planned to spend $388 million directly on the Gateway Program. Another $153 million would come from FTA grants, comprising the rest of the $541 million that would be made available. In June 2018, the State of New Jersey approved $600 million in bonds to finance the Portal Bridge part of the project. In its 2020 budget, the Trump administration cut funding for the Gateway Program by half, from $650 to $325 million.

With the inauguration of Joe Biden as U.S. President in January 2021, discussion resumed on the Gateway Program. Schumer, who had become the Senate majority leader, said that month that he was working with Pete Buttigieg, the Transportation Secretary of Biden's administration, to allocate $12 billion to the project. Buttigieg supported the project, saying, "This is a regional issue, but one of national significance."

Final approval
On May 28, 2021, the project was formally approved by the federal government. The Infrastructure Investment and Jobs Act, passed in November 2021, appropriated billions in funds for the Gateway Project and other upgrades to the Northeast Corridor. The next month, the United States Army Corps of Engineers gave final approval. On August 31, 2022, the Gateway Development Commission announced that the new tunnels would be completed in 2035 and that the existing North River Tunnels would be rehabilitated by 2038. The project will use federal funding from the Infrastructure Investment and Jobs Act, with the balance provided by the states of New Jersey and New York.

In July 2022, New Jersey officials and New York officials each agreed to pay 25 percent of the project's cost; under the agreement, federal officials would pay 50 percent. The New Jersey Turnpike Authority agreed to help fund New Jersey's portion of the project in December 2022. Schumer said the same month that construction on the project would commence in 2023 with $292 million in federal funding. Biden subsequently announced that the $292 million grant would be used to complete the final phase of the Hudson Yards "tunnel box".

Existing and new infrastructure along right of way 
The system operates at capacity during peak hours—24 trains per hour—and limits speed for safety reasons. The new route would run parallel to the current right-of-way, enabling dispatching alternatives, potential speed increases, and up to 24 more trains per hour.

Newark Penn, Dock Bridge, and Harrison PATH station

The station and the west span of the bridge, carrying three tracks, were built in 1935. The east span, opened in 1937, carries one outbound track, and the two Port Authority Trans Hudson (PATH) rapid transit tracks entering and leaving the station. The bridge, owned by the Port Authority of New York and New Jersey (PANYNJ), underwent repairs as recently as 2009. To the northeast lies the PATH's Harrison station. Between the bridge and the station Amtrak and NJT trains are aligned on three center tracks to pass through it, with the PATH using side platforms. While not part of the Gateway Project, the station itself is undergoing a $173 million reconstruction and expansion funded by the PANYNJ which owns and operates the PATH and the Federal Transit Administration. Passenger use is expected to grow as the area develops; it already includes the Red Bull Arena. Maps for the Gateway Project indicate that a fourth track for the NEC will be added through the station.

Sawtooth Bridges-Kearny Meadows

While there is no junction with PATH, NJT trains can switch tracks, depending on their terminal of origination or destination, enabling Midtown Direct trains on the Morris and Essex Lines to join or depart the Northeast Corridor. The single track limited-use Waterfront Connection connects some lines using diesel trains on Hoboken Terminal trips with the NEC to the west. Plans call for replacement of the bridges and expansion from two to four tracks, requiring the construction of bridges in the Kearny Meadows at Newark Turnpike and Belleville Turnpike.

Portal Bridge

In December 2008, the Federal Railroad Administration (FRA) approved a $1.34 billion project to replace the Portal Bridge with two new bridges: a three-track bridge to the north, and a two-track bridge to the south. In 2009, New Jersey applied for funding from the American Recovery and Reinvestment Act of 2009 and on January 28, 2010, received $38.5 million for design. In April 2011, Amtrak applied for $570 million for construction from US DOT. New Jersey was expected to contribute $150 million.

Plans call for two two-track bridges, a Portal North Bridge and a Portal South Bridge. In the early design years, cycling advocates, with Lautenberg's support, lobbied to include a bike path that would have become part of the East Coast Greenway, however that was not included in the final design of the Portal North Bridge.

In October 2015, a $16 million TIGER grant was awarded and will be used to support early construction activities such as realignment of a 138 kV transmission monopole, constructing a temporary fiber optic cable pole line, building a finger pier construction access structure, a service access road and a 560-foot retaining wall.

Construction on the new bridges had been scheduled to begin in 2010 and wrap up in 2017, at which time the Portal Bridge would have been dismantled; however, the project encountered numerous delays primarily due to a lack of state and federal funding during the Republican administrations of New Jersey Governor, Chris Christie and U.S. President Donald Trump, both of whom opposed the project.

In June 2020, Trump informed NJ Governor Phil Murphy that he would no longer oppose the Portal Bridge replacement, allowing the project to begin once it could be properly financed. The first phase of the project, the construction of two-track Portal North Bridge, which would not expand capacity, is expected to take 6 years to complete once construction begins. A timeline for the construction of two-track Portal South Bridge has not yet been released. Construction on the new bridge began on August 1, 2022, with a groundbreaking ceremony.

Secaucus Junction–Bergen Loop

Opened on December 15, 2003, at a cost of $450 million, Secaucus Junction (at ) is an interchange station served by nine of New Jersey Transit's rail lines, and is sited where Hoboken Terminal trains intersect with those traveling along the Northeast Corridor. Passenger transfers are possible, but there is no rail junction. While Access to the Region's Core had planned a loop to create a junction, original plans for the Gateway Program did not. Amtrak trains pass through the station, but do not stop there, nor are there plans to include an Amtrak stop. In April 2012, Amtrak announced that the project might include a "Bergen Loop" connecting Main Line, Bergen County Line, Pascack Valley Line and Port Jervis Line service to the NEC at Secaucus Junction. MTA constituencies are encouraging the agency to include funding for the loop its capital plan.

If a loop were built, passengers bound for New York Penn Station would not need to use Secaucus Junction for transfers. Trains using the loop would also increase the capacity demands on the already over-capacity NEC which the Gateway Program is designed to alleviate. Suburban property owners along the Main Line/Bergen County Line and Pascack Valley Line would stand to gain economically as property values have increased significantly along commuter rail lines once they were upgraded to offer "single-seat commutes".

Hudson Tunnel

The Gateway Program would build two new tunnels, doubling the rail capacity. The current North River Tunnels allow a maximum of 24 one-way crossings per hour; the Gateway proposal would allow an additional 24 trains per hour.

The North River Tunnels were 102 years old when they were inundated by seawater from Hurricane Sandy in October 2012. If the new Hudson Tunnel is not built, the North River Tunnels will have to be closed one at a time, reducing weekday service below the existing level of 24 trains per hour. Due to the need to provide two-way service on a single track, service would be reduced by over 50 percent. In the best-case scenario, with perfect operating conditions, 9 trains per hour could be provided through the tunnel, or a 63% reduction in service. During the duration of construction, passengers would have to use overcrowded PATH, buses, and ferries to get between New Jersey and New York. In May 2014, Amtrak CEO Joseph Boardman told the Regional Plan Association that there was something less than 20 years before one or both of the tunnels would have to be shut down.

As a result of the storm damage and the tunnels' age, component failures regularly occur within the tubes, resulting in frequent delays. One report in 2019 estimated that the North River Tubes and the Portal Bridge contributed to 2,000 hours of delays between 2014 and 2018. The North River Tunnels need to be repaired without major reductions in weekday service, making it necessary to have new tunnels built. Once the new tunnels open, the two North River Tunnels would close for repairs, one at a time, with the existing level of service maintained. They will be closed one at a time as without one of the North River Tunnels in service, the existing level of service cannot be maintained. This is because the new tunnel would be located further south–there would be no access to Track 19, and Tracks 9-18 would only have access to the tunnel by the single I ladder-track. Once the new North River Tunnels reopen in 2030, capacity on the line would be doubled. The Hudson Tunnel Project would also allow for resiliency on the Northeast Corridor to be increased, making service along the line more reliable with redundant capacity.

In April 2011, $188 million in federal funding was requested for preliminary engineering studies and environmental analysis. On May 2, 2016, the FRA published a Notice of Intent to jointly prepare an environmental impact statement (EIS) with NJ Transit for the Hudson Tunnel Project under the National Environmental Policy Act (NEPA). The EIS will evaluate the potential environmental impacts of a reasonable range of alternatives, including a no-build alternative. As appropriate, FRA and NJ Transit will coordinate with Amtrak and PANYNJ on the EIS. 

The ARC Tunnel was to be built in three sections: under the Hudson Palisades, under the Hudson River, and under the streets of Manhattan, where it would have dead-ended. The Hudson Tunnel will likely be built along the footprint of the Palisades and river sections, but will enable trains to join the current interlocking once it emerges. A flying junction is planned for later stages. This will allow Amtrak and NJT to continue to use the East River Tunnels and Sunnyside Yards for staging, storage, and carrying Amtrak NEC trains.
The Draft Environmental Impact Study (DEIS) for Gateway tunnels was issued in June 2017. Four alternatives for alignments under the Hudson River and the Palisades. Option 1 would have the new tunnels run close to the existing tunnels with a ventilation site near the Lincoln Tunnel Helix. This option would have required a construction staging site within the Lincoln Tunnel Helix, thus displacing New Jersey Transit's Weehawken bus storage site, which would have a negative impact on the operation of buses to the Port Authority Bus Terminal. Option 2 would have the new tunnels run further south than the first option, with a shaft site north of 19th Street near JFK Boulevard East. This option would require the acquisition and demolition of an existing multi-story office building to build the shaft site. The third option would be further south with a shaft site south of 19th Street. This option would preclude the development of a portion of a planned residential development under construction at 800 Harbor Boulevard. The fourth option would be further south with a shaft site south of 18th Street–following the same horizontal alignment identified in the ARC FEIS. Alignment Option 4 was chosen for the build alternative even though it would have a slightly longer tunnel than in the other alternatives. Because of the additional length, there would be additional tunneling costs for this option. However, the first three options have greater pre-construction risks, meaning that if construction was delayed the cost difference would be minimized. In addition, Option 4 does not have the issues that the first three options have.

The new tunnel would be built to comply with the National Fire Protection Association (NFPA) 130, Standard for Fixed Guideway Transit and Passenger Rail Systems, with the two tubes connected by cross passages every  with fire-rated doors to separate the two tubes. The tunnel would be constructed through the use of two tunnel boring machines beneath the river bottom.

While the Hudson Tunnel Project would double the number of tracks under the Hudson River, it would not result in an increase in rail capacity due to constraints at Penn Station. Penn Station operates at capacity during peak periods, and since it takes a long time for passengers to board and alight trains, trains cannot leave and enter the station as might otherwise be possible. Even with improvements in the station, there are inadequate train storage facilities at Penn, and there is no capacity in the East River Tunnels to allow for trains to be stored during middays at Sunnyside Yard. Without these additional improvements, it is assumed that the same number of trains going between New Jersey and New York today would be operating in 2030, albeit with the additional tunnel capacity.

Palisades Tunnel
The land, which cost $26.3 million, is owned by NJT. A tunneling contract for the Palisades Tunnel was awarded on May 5, 2010, to Skanska. Maps indicate this part of the Hudson Tunnel would follow a route to the Weehawken-Hoboken border. In October 2012, in an eminent domain case for a property in Weehawken NJ Transit acquired a parcel in the path of the tunnel for $8.5 million.

Hudson River Tunnel
Engineering studies for ARC along this route had been deemed unfeasible. Surveys of properties which would or would not be affected by underground construction at underground eastern end of the ARC Tunnel had been completed.

Hudson Yards "tunnel box" and West Side Yard

The air rights over the West Side Yard are being developed as a residential and commercial district on a platform constructed over the yard as part of the Hudson Yards project. Placing a new Amtrak portal in Manhattan could have conflicted with the Hudson Yards project, which broke ground in late 2012. In February 2013, Amtrak officials said they would commission a project to preserve a right-of-way under Hudson Yards for future use, to be built with $120 million to $150 million in federal funds. in June 2013 it was announced that $183 million had been dedicated to the "tunnel box" as part of Hurricane Sandy recovery funding.

Amtrak awarded Tutor Perini a $133 million contract to build a section of box tunnel. This portion was completed a year later. Construction started in December 2014 and was nearing completion , though funding disputes stalled the tunnel box's completion. The tunnel box was substantially complete by November 2017. The following phase would extend the casing between 11th and 12th Avenue as the development of Hudson Yards continues westward.

To connect the tunnel to Penn Station, extensive track modifications will be required. The profile of several tracks will have to be lowered so that they can meet the grade of the new tunnel tracks at the new portal within A Yard. The I Ladder track, which runs diagonal to the other tracks to provide connections to the platforms tracks, would be extended to connect to the new tracks from the tunnel, allowing trains to stop on Tracks 1 through 18. Some tracks within A Yard would be reconfigured. While construction takes place in A Yard, the three trains stored in A Yard and D Yard would be stored in other locations due to the unavailability of storage tracks in those yards. The Empire Line tunnel, near Tenth Avenue, will be modified–100 feet of that tunnel beneath Tenth Avenue will be lowered so that they can connect to the lower track profile in A Yard. This work will either be constructed during weekends over a 20-month period, or through a full closure of the Empire Line tunnel for two to three months. All of this work would take 21 months.

New York Penn Station
The original Pennsylvania Station in New York was completed in 1910, and subsequently demolished starting in 1963. The current Penn Station, part of the Pennsylvania Plaza complex which includes Madison Square Garden (MSG), was completed in 1968. In 2013, the New York City Council voted to extend the MSG Special Permit by a maximum of ten years, in an effort to have the arena move to a different location so that a new station structure can be built in its place.

Between 1976 and 2010 weekday train movements increased 89%, from 661 to 1,248, reaching what is considered to be capacity. In 2010, the station saw 550,000 daily boardings/alightings.

Moynihan Train Hall

In the early 1990s, then-New York Senator Daniel Moynihan championed a proposal to convert the James Farley Post Office to a train station. Opened in 1912, soon after the original Pennsylvania Station, the landmark building stood across from Penn Plaza and was built over tracks approaching the station from the west.

In 2010, work began on a $267 million Phase 1. This phase consisted of an expansion of the Long Island Rail Road's underground West End Concourse, which ran under the Farley Building's main entrance, as well as two entrances to the existing Penn Station platforms through the Farley Building on Eighth Avenue. A groundbreaking ceremony took place on October 18, 2010. In May 2012, the PANYNJ announced that a $270 million contract for the first phase, including the concourse expansion under 8th Avenue, had been awarded. The West End Concourse opened in June 2017.

Phase 2 consisted of the new train hall in the fully renovated Farley Building. In January 2016, New York governor Cuomo announced plans for a combined Penn-Farley Post Office complex, a project estimated to cost $3 billion. At that time, the project was renamed Moynihan Train Hall. In August 2017, a groundbreaking ceremony was held for the Moynihan Train Hall. The train hall opened to the public on January 1, 2021.

Penn Station South

Plans call for Penn Station South to be located on the block south of the current New York Penn Station at 31st Street and diagonally across Eighth Avenue from the post office, on land which is currently privately held. While the PANYNJ had been acquiring land for ARC along its route, acquisition south of the station has not begun. It is likely the entire block would be razed and made available for highrise construction after completion of the station. Plans call for seven tracks served by four platforms in what will be a terminal annex to the entire station complex. In April 2011 Amtrak requested $50 million in federal funding for preliminary engineering and environmental analysis.

In 2014, it was estimated that it would cost $404 million to purchase 35 properties in order to build a new terminal at the location. Based on development guidelines from the New York City Planning Commission, it is estimated that at 2015 prices it would cost between $769 million and $1.3 billion to buy the block bounded to the north and south by 31st and 30th streets, and to the east and west by Seventh and Eighth avenues. Real estate prices are 2½ times higher now than they were in 2012 according to prominent real estate firm Cushman & Wakefield.

Related projects
Other projects in the New York metropolitan area are planned as part of the NEC Next Generation High Speed Rail, including the northern and southern approaches to the Gateway Project.

New Brunswick–Trenton high-speed upgrade
In May 2011, $450 million was dedicated to increase capacity on one of the NEC's busiest segments, a  section between New Brunswick and Trenton, New Jersey. The planned six-year project will upgrade signals and electrical power systems, including catenary wires, to improve reliability, increase train speeds, and allow more frequent high-speed trains. In July 2011, a bill passed by the House of Representatives threatened funding for the project and others announced at the same time, but the money was released the following month. In September 2012, Acela test trains hit  over the segment. The track work is one of several projects planned for the "New Jersey Speedway" section of the NEC, which include a new station at North Brunswick, the Mid-Line Loop (a flyover for reversing train direction), and the re-construction of County Yard, to be done in coordination with NJT.

Harold Interlocking and Hutchinson River
Over 750 LIRR, NJT, and Amtrak trains travel through the Harold Interlocking every day, causing frequent conflicts and delays. In May 2011, a $294.7 million federal grant was awarded to address congestion at the USA's busiest rail junction and part of the Sunnyside Yard in Queens. The work will allow for a dedicated track to the New York Connecting Railroad right of way for Amtrak trains arriving from or bound for New England, thus avoiding NJT and LIRR traffic. A new flying junction will allow Amtrak trains to travel through the interlocking separately from LIRR and NJ Transit trains on their way to Sunnyside. Financing for the project was jeopardized when the House of Representatives voted in July 2011 to divert the money to unrelated projects., but was later obligated so that work on the project could begin in 2012.

Amtrak applied in 2011 for $15 million for the environmental impact studies and preliminary engineering design to examine replacement options for the more than 100-year-old, low-level movable Pelham Bay Bridge over the Hutchinson River in The Bronx. The goal is for a new bridge to support expanded service and speeds up to 110 mph (177 km/h).

Subway service
While not part of the Gateway Project, Amtrak's announcement included a proposal to extend the Metropolitan Transportation Authority (MTA) 7 Subway Extension three blocks east to New York Penn Station from the current station at 11th Avenue and 34th Street. This would provide service to the Javits Convention Center and a one-seat ride to Grand Central Terminal, the city's other major train terminal on the East Side of Manhattan at 42nd Street. Shortly before the introduction of Gateway, the New York City Economic Development Corporation voted to budget up to $250,000 for a feasibility study of a Hudson River tunnel for an extension to Secaucus Junction awarded to Parsons Brinckerhoff, a major engineering firm that had been working on the ARC tunnel. In October 2011, NYC Mayor Michael Bloomberg reiterated his support for the NJ extension, estimated to cost around $10 billion and take ten years to complete, indicating that he would give approval by the end of his third term in 2013. Environmental-impact studies and a full business plan are required before the proposal proceeds. It was likely that the two projects—Gateway and the subway extension—would have been in competition for funding.

In April 2012, citing budget considerations, the director of the MTA effectively scuttled the project and said that it was doubtful the extension would be built in the foreseeable future, suggesting that the Gateway Project was a much more likely solution to congestion at Hudson River crossings. The report was released in April 2013. In a November 2013 Daily News opinion article, the president of the Real Estate Board of New York and the chairman of Edison Properties called for the line to be extended to Secaucus in tunnels to be shared with the Gateway Project. In November 2013, the New Jersey Assembly passed a Resolution 168 supporting the extension of the line to Hoboken and Secaucus.

See also

 Cross-Harbor Rail Tunnel – freight rail project proposed in 1993
 High-speed rail in the United States
 
 List of fixed crossings of the North River (Hudson River)
 List of bridges, tunnels, and cuts in Hudson County, New Jersey
 List of bridges and tunnels in New York City

References

Further reading

External links

Gateway Tunnel Video. New York Governor Andrew Cuomo. October 19, 2018. (5:23)

Crossings of the Hudson River
Hackensack River
High-speed railway lines in the United States
Hudson River
Hudson Yards, Manhattan
New Jersey Meadowlands District
NJ Transit
Passaic River
Passenger rail transportation in New Jersey
Passenger rail transportation in New York (state)
Proposed railway lines in New Jersey
Proposed tunnels in the United States
Railroad tunnels in New Jersey
Railroad tunnels in New York City
Transportation in Hudson County, New Jersey
Transportation in Newark, New Jersey
Proposed railway lines in New York (state)
Proposed railway tunnels in North America
Port Authority of New York and New Jersey
Northeast Corridor